Louis-Eugène Tauzin (born 12 August 1882, date of death unknown) was a French sculptor. He was the son of the French artist and lithographer Louis Tauzin (1842-1915). His work was exhibited at the Paris Salon in 1907, 1909, 1910 (a portrait bust of his father), and 1912.

His work was included in the sculpture event in the art competition at the 1924 Summer Olympics.

Works

References

1882 births
Year of death missing
19th-century French sculptors
20th-century French sculptors
French male sculptors
Olympic competitors in art competitions
People from Meudon
19th-century French male artists